Korfiz Holm (also Corfitz Holm (21 August 1872 - 5 August 1942 was a German publisher, translator and author.

Life 
Diedrich Heinrich Corfitz/Korfiz Holm was born into a German speaking family in Riga, where his father Diedrich Eduard Holm (1846–95) worked as a railway company director.   His mother, Maria "Mia" Holm (1845-1912:  sometimes identified in sources by her maiden name as Maria von Hedenström), was the daughter of a Protestant pastor from Sweden:  she achieved a measure of notability on her own account as a poet and novelist.

Holm attended school at the Gymnasium (secondary school) in Riga.   At least one source refers to part of his childhood having been spent in Moscow, but most make no mention of this.   If there was a period in Moscow it was almost certainly brief, and probably connected with his father's business as the director of a railway company:  by the time his father died, in 1895, Diedrich Holm was in Saratov, a large industrial far to the south of Moscow.   In 1885 his parents separated, however.  After the divorce, which appears to have followed only in 1890 when his father wished to marry someone else, he moved with his mother to briefly to Munich and from there to Lübeck in Germany.   It was at the prestigious "Katharineum" ("humanistic secondary school") in  Lübeck that he completed the final two years of his schooling.   A contemporary at the school (actually nearly three years younger than Holm) was Thomas Mann.   During their time at the school, Holm was assigned to help out as "Mann's gymnastics coach".   Thomas Mann viewed the whole business of school gymnastics with intense dislike, but could on occasion be persuaded to compromise his principals to the extent of touching the horizontal exercise bars with his fingertips, while casting a look of withering contempt at the equipment.   When it came to the more obviously cerebral aspects of the school curriculum, the future creator of Buddenbrooks and Zauberberg was, according to school reports, an adequately committed pupil; and while the school authorities refused to view his conduct in gymnastics classes with complete equanimity, Mann's rebellious aversion to organised exercise did not prevent a friendship from forming with his schoolboy "gymnastics coach".   Later, when they were all grown up and Holm had joined a publishing business, he intervened to help Mann obtain work with the Munich-based satirical magazine "Simplicissimus".

Holm was already 21 during the early summer of 1894 when, at a slightly older age than was conventional, he passed his "Reifeprüfung" ("Matriculation" - school graduation exam).  He enrolled to study for a degree in Jurisprudence at Berlin University.   That same year he moved on to Munich University, intending to stay for a year as part of his degree course.   As matters turned out, Munich would remain his home city for the rest of his life, though it is not clear that he ever completed his degree.   Soon after arriving in Munich he enrolled as an "Einjährig-Freiwilliger" for military service with the Royal Bavarian Infantry Lifeguards Regiment, under a scheme which permitted applicants to undertake their military service over a reduced duration of just one year, provided they agreed to pay their own costs in respect of equipment, food and clothing.

His first published poems appeared in the weekly magazine "Simplicissimus" in 1896.  The new magazine had been launched by Albert Langen in April of that year.   According to a story he later liked to relate, Holm had come across Langen in the first place only because of confusion on the part of his mother between the art publisher "Josef Albert" and the magazine publisher "Albert Langen".   Josef Albert seems to have been a printer of then fashionable coloured post cards.  His premises only occupied the ground floor of the building into which Holm's mother marched while, armed with a list of possible "art publishers" compiled by her son, she sought out a publisher for some illustrated poems that her son had produced.   (The illustrations had been produced by one of her own contacts in the Munich arts world.) Joseph Albert's large brass name plate, including the name "Albert", dominated the various signs by the entrance   It seems probable that the publisher of "Simplicissimus", Albert Langen, had his office on a higher floor in the same building.   In any event, shortly after publishing some of Holm's poems, Langen agreed that the young man could help him, starting on 1 October 1896, as an unpaid internee.  The interneeship quickly became a paid job.   Langen himself had married the nineteen year-old Dagny Bjørnson Sautreau in 1896, after which it seems that Holm was encouraged to take more responsibility within the business.  By 1898 Korfiz Holm had gained his employer's confidence to the point at which he became a "Prokurist", contractually authorised to sign off certain agreements on behalf of Langen's publishing business.   During the next few years titles by Heinrich Mann, Henrik Ibsen, Marcel Prévost and Verner von Heidenstam were published.   Together, Langen and Holm evidently made formidable team:  business was booming.   In April 1909, however, Albert Langen died as a deferred consequence of Otitis media.   After 1909 Holm managed the business as a trustee ("Kurator" / "Treuhänder").

Meanwhile, in 1899 Korfiz Holm married the young widow Augusta "Annie" Ziemann (1872-1942), thereby instantly acquiring three step-children.   Edith Holm  (1901-1978), the couple's fourth child, was born a couple of years following the marriage in Munich.

In 1918 or 1919 Holm became one of three co-owners of the Albert Langen publishing business.   A further significant change in the ownership structure came about in 1932 when the Langen publishing business was merged with the Georg Müller publishing business.   Holm remained in post as "Mitgeschäftsführer" (loosely, "Joint-CEO") of the combined publishing firm "Albert Langen — Georg Müller Verlag GmbH" till his death in 1942.

Korfiz Holm died in Munich after a long illness on 5 August 1942.

Works 
Korfiz Holm was the author of novels, short stories, poems and stage plays.   His work can be classified as entertainment literature.  He also published several engaging autobiographical volumes and shorter pieces about his childhood and years as a young man in Munich.   He also translated works of literature into German from Russian, French and Danish.   His translations of Gogol, still regarded as classics of their kind, found a particularly welcoming resonance with critics and readers.

Output (selection)

as author

translations into German

Notes

References 

1872 births
1942 deaths
Humboldt University of Berlin alumni
Ludwig Maximilian University of Munich alumni
19th-century German male writers
20th-century German male writers
German publishers (people)
German printers
20th-century publishers (people)
Translators from Danish
Translators from French
Translators from Russian
Translators to German
People from Riga
People from Lübeck